Horqin Left Rear Banner (original Mongolian name Büve vang qosigu) is a banner of southeastern Inner Mongolia, People's Republic of China, bordering Liaoning province to the south. The local Mongolian dialect is Khorchin Mongolian.

Climate

Notes

References

External links
www.xzqh.org 

Banners of Inner Mongolia
Tongliao